The 1993 Auburn Tigers football team represented Auburn University in the 1993 NCAA Division I-A football season. Under first-year head coach Terry Bowden, the team went undefeated with a record of 11–0 and finished #4 in the AP Poll. Due to NCAA probation, Auburn was banned from TV and post-season play, and suffered reduced scholarships.  The post-season ban prevented Auburn from playing the SEC Championship and a bowl game. Nonetheless, Auburn was the only major college football team to finish the season undefeated. The National Champions Foundation recognized Auburn as one of its 1993 national champions; however, Auburn University only formally recognizes championships for the 1957 and 2010 seasons, although the official website for Auburn athletics does highlight the 1993 team.

Schedule

Roster

Rankings

Game summaries

Ole Miss

Samford

at LSU

Southern Miss

at Vanderbilt

Mississippi State

Florida

at Arkansas

New Mexico State

at Georgia

Alabama

References

Auburn
Auburn Tigers football seasons
College football undefeated seasons
Auburn Tigers football